Friedrich Josten (14 April 1945 – 21 July 1983) was a German field hockey player. He competed in the men's tournament at the 1968 Summer Olympics.

References

External links
 

1945 births
1983 deaths
German male field hockey players
Olympic field hockey players of West Germany
Field hockey players at the 1968 Summer Olympics
Sportspeople from Duisburg